Lyudmila Radchenko may refer to:

 Liudmyla Radchenko (born 1932), Soviet-Ukrainian long jumper
 Ludmilla Radchenko (born 1978), Russian model, artist and actress